Columbia Edgewater Country Club is a private golf course in the northwest United States, located in Portland, Oregon. Founded  in 1924 it has hosted numerous tour events on the PGA Tour and LPGA Tour. It is located immediately west of the Portland International Airport.

Designed by A.V. Macan, the course opened in July 1925, just south of the Columbia River. It hosted the Portland Open Invitational on the PGA Tour four times in the 1960s, and has hosted the Portland Classic on the LPGA Tour over thirty times.

References

External links

Golf clubs and courses in Oregon
Sports venues in Portland, Oregon
Buildings and structures in Multnomah County, Oregon
Sports venues completed in 1925
1924 establishments in Oregon
Golf clubs and courses designed by A. V. Macan